This is the list of the number-one albums of the UK Album Downloads Chart during the 2010s. , thirty albums have returned to number one. They are: Recovery by Eminem, Now That's What I Call Xmas by various artists, Loud by Rihanna, 21 by Adele, Progress by Take That, Beyoncé's self-titled album Beyoncé, Bad Blood by Bastille, AM by Arctic Monkeys, In the Lonely Hour by Sam Smith, x by Ed Sheeran, Wanted on Voyage by George Ezra, 1989 by Taylor Swift, Now That's What I Call Music! 90 by various artists, Now That's What I Call a Summer Party by Various Artists and Now That's What I Call Music! 91 by Various Artists, 25 by Adele, Now That's What I Call Christmas! by Various Artists, A Head Full of Dreams by Coldplay, Now That's What I Call Summer Hits, Now That's What I Call Music! 94, Now That's What I Call Music! 95 by Various Artists, Classic House by Pete Tong, Now That's What I Call Music! 96, Now That's What I Call Music! 98, The Greatest Showman, Now That's What I Call Music! 99, Now That's What I Call Music! 100,A Star Is Born, Now That's What I Call Music! 103 and Divinely Uninspired to a Hellish Extent by Lewis Capaldi.

Number-one albums

By artist

Sixteen different artists have spent four or more weeks at the top of the UK Official Download Chart so far during the 2010s. The totals below do not include compilation albums credited to various artists.

By record label
Twenty seven different record labels have released chart-topping albums so far during the 2010s.The totals below do not include compilation albums credited to various artists apart from soundtracks which are included.

See also
List of UK Compilation Chart number ones of the 2010s

References

External links
Album Download Chart Archive at the Official Charts Company

2010s in British music
United Kingdom Albums Downloads
Download